The Cher, also referred to as the Cher River and the River Cher, is a river in central France, a left tributary of the Loire. Its source is in the Creuse department, north-east of Crocq. It joins the river Loire at Villandry, west of Tours.

The river suffered a devastating flood in 1940, which damaged the Château de Chenonceau, which spans the river, and other structures along the banks. It owes its name to the pre-Indo-European root kʰar 'stone'.

Departments and towns 

The Cher flows through the following departments, and along the following towns:
 Creuse 
 Allier: Montluçon
 Cher: Saint-Amand-Montrond, Vierzon
 Loir-et-Cher
 Indre-et-Loire: Tours

Tributaries 

The main tributaries of the Cher are, from spring to mouth (L: left / R: right):

 (L) Tardes
 (L) Voueize
 (R) Amaron or Lamaron at Montluçon
 (R) Aumance at Meaulne
 (R) Yèvre at Vierzon
 (L) Auron
 (R) Colin
 (L) Arnon at Vierzon
 (L) Théols
 (R) Sauldre at Selles-sur-Cher
 (L) Fouzon above Saint-Aignan

Navigation 
The Cher was part of a network of waterways that linked the city of Tours to Nevers, where connections to other regions of France existed. , only the  section between Larçay (southeast of Tours) and Noyers-sur-Cher is navigable for small boats (maximum draft 80 cm). It has 14 locks. At Noyers-sur-Cher, it is connected with the Canal de Berry, of which only the westernmost  section until Selles-sur-Cher is navigable.

References

Rivers of France
 
Rivers of Allier
Rivers of Cher (department)
Rivers of Creuse
Rivers of Indre-et-Loire
Rivers of Loir-et-Cher
Rivers of Auvergne-Rhône-Alpes
Rivers of Centre-Val de Loire
Rivers of Nouvelle-Aquitaine